Leo Phokas or Phocas may refer to:

 Leo Phokas the Elder, Byzantine general in the early 10th century
 Leo Phokas the Younger, great-nephew of the above, Byzantine general in the mid-10th century